is a Japanese football club based in Nikaho, Akita, the southern city of Akita Prefecture. They play in the Tohoku Soccer League. Their team colour is blue.

League record

Key

Honours
Akita Prefecture League:(3)
Champions: 2005, 2007, 2010

Current squad

Notable players

Jun Kaga
Kyohei Maeyama
Shunsuke Miura
Takuya Narita
Toshihito Ono
Moriyasu Saito
Kazuki Sato
Yoshiyuki Sato
Taro Sugahara
Kazuhiro Suzuki
Takanori Takahashi
Go Togashi
Torai Kamata

Gallery

See also
 Blaublitz Akita, the original TDK football club

References

 
TDK
Football clubs in Japan
Association football clubs established in 1987
Sports teams in Akita Prefecture
Nikaho, Akita
1987 establishments in Japan
Works association football clubs in Japan